Napoleon's Campaigns in Miniature:War Gamers' Guide to the Napoleonic Wars, 1796–1815 is a book written by Bruce Quarrie. It concerns wargaming in the Napoleonic era, and provides information on history, weapons, painting, and also its own set of rules. The book remained in print until at least 1992 when the 4th edition was published.

One of the early works on the subject, the book has continued to exert a influence on this period in wargaming. One wargaming site says, "This book (and the rules in it) have been a Bible to many wargamers (and probably still is)".

Footnotes

1977 non-fiction books